Valley Christian Academy (VCA) is a Christian school located near the town of Osler, Saskatchewan.  The School is an associate school of the Prairie Spirit School Division.  It encompasses grades K–6 (elementary school), and 7–12 (high school).

History 
VCA was founded in 1986, by the Bergthaler Mennonite Church in the nearby town of Warman, Saskatchewan.

Curriculum 
VCA complies to the provincial curriculum, with modifications made when necessary to maintain a Christian perspective.  An example of this is replacing material on the Theory of Evolution with material on the Creation Theory.  In addition to the provincial curriculum, VCA offers Christian Ethics as a mandatory class for all grade levels.

Staff 
The school also only hires Christian Staff members.

Funding 
While the school is funded by the provincial government of Saskatchewan, students are also required to pay tuition fees according to how many siblings they have that attend the school:

Students in Kindergarten pay half of whatever category they fall under.

References

External links
Official Site
Official Site of Prairie Spirit School Division

Christian schools in Canada
Educational institutions established in 1986
Elementary schools in Saskatchewan
High schools in Saskatchewan
Private schools in Saskatchewan
1986 establishments in Saskatchewan